In Greek mythology, the name Damastor (Ancient Greek: Δαμάστωρ means "tamer") may refer to:

Damastor, a Giant. During the Gigantomachy, he used a rock into which a fellow Giant Pallas had been changed as a throwing weapon.
Damastor, a son of Nauplius, father of Peristhenes and through him grandfather of Dictys and Polydectes.
Damastor, father of a defender of Troy, Tlepolemus.
Damastor, father of Agelaus, one of the Suitors of Penelope.
Damastor, another Suitor of Penelope who came from Dulichium along with other 56 wooers. He, with the other suitors, was shot dead by Odysseus with the help of Eumaeus, Philoetius, and Telemachus.

The patronymic Damastorides "son of Damastor" is used in reference to Agelaus and Tlepolemus but also to an otherwise unnamed defender of Troy killed by Agamemnon.

Damastor, A Dark Fantasy novel by Dimitri Iatrou.

Notes

References 

 Homer, The Iliad with an English Translation by A.T. Murray, Ph.D. in two volumes. Cambridge, MA., Harvard University Press; London, William Heinemann, Ltd. 1924. . Online version at the Perseus Digital Library.
 Homer, Homeri Opera in five volumes. Oxford, Oxford University Press. 1920. . Greek text available at the Perseus Digital Library.
 Homer, The Odyssey with an English Translation by A.T. Murray, PH.D. in two volumes. Cambridge, MA., Harvard University Press; London, William Heinemann, Ltd. 1919. . Online version at the Perseus Digital Library. Greek text available from the same website.
 Quintus Smyrnaeus, The Fall of Troy translated by Way. A. S. Loeb Classical Library Volume 19. London: William Heinemann, 1913. Online version at theio.com
 Quintus Smyrnaeus, The Fall of Troy. Arthur S. Way. London: William Heinemann; New York: G.P. Putnam's Sons. 1913. Greek text available at the Perseus Digital Library.

Gigantes
Trojans
Suitors of Penelope